Mattioni is a surname. Notable people with the surname include:

 Eszter Mattioni (1902–1993), Hungarian painter
 Felipe Mattioni (born 1988), Brazilian footballer
 Patrick Mattioni (born 1966), French gymnast

See also
 Mattoni